Håkan Carlqvist (15 January 1954 – 6 July 2017) was a Swedish professional motocross racer. 
He competed in the Motocross World Championships from 1974 to 1988. Carlqvist was a two-time world champion who was known for his fierce competitiveness.

Biography
Born in the Järfälla Municipality near Stockholm, Sweden, Carlqvist began competing in the world championships as a privateer riding an Ossa. He won the F.I.M. 250cc Motocross World Championship in 1979 as a member of the Husqvarna factory racing team. He also won the 1979 Le Touquet beach race.

In 1980, he switched to Yamaha to contest the 500cc motocross world championship. He finished 3rd in 1981 and 7th in 1982. In 1983, he battled against Honda teammates André Malherbe and Graham Noyce to claim the 500cc world championship, on a Yamaha.

In 1984, an injury stopped Carlqvist from contesting the title again. He raced for Yamaha until end of 1986. He continued the 500 GPs in 1987 and 1988 with a privateer Kawasaki KX500. His last Grand Prix victory was the Belgian Grand Prix at Namur in 1988. During this race, he stunned the spectators by stopping before the end of the 2nd moto to drink a beer, while leading the race by somewhat 50 seconds, and going back into the race to win it.

In 1983, alongside his motocross racing he also started to try out three wheeled racing.  He was first with Yamaha but in 1986 he rode for Honda and he won the national three wheeled championship in Sweden.  He had plans to come to the United States in 1987 to race for Honda and several Honda ATCs were built specially for him.  However, under political pressures ATCs and three wheelers were banned in the United States following many reported injuries and pressure from consumer groups.  He never made it to America to race for Honda.

Carlqvist died on 6 July 2017 from the effects of a brain hemorrhage he suffered the previous day.

References

External links
 

1954 births
2017 deaths
Sportspeople from Stockholm
People from Järfälla Municipality
Swedish motocross riders
Place of birth missing
20th-century Swedish people